The following is a list of episodes for The WB sitcom Smart Guy. In total, there were 51 episodes of the show shot over the course of its 3-season run, from April 2, 1997, to May 16, 1999.

Series overview

Episodes

Season 1 (1997)

Season 2 (1997–98)
 Omar Gooding, who was a recurring guest star in the first season, becomes a series regular starting with the season premiere episode "Primary Brothers".

Season 3 (1998–99)
 Season 3's opening song/credits changed from the first two seasons.

External links

Lists of American sitcom episodes
Lists of Disney television series episodes